Bad Boys of the Arctic is an album by Gary Lucas. It was released on September 20, 1994, through Enemy Records.

Track listing

Personnel 
Musicians
Jean Chaine – bass guitar
Jonathan Kane – drums
Gary Lucas – vocals, guitar, sampler, production
Production and additional personnel
Jon Altschiller – engineering
Gregg Bendian – percussion on "After Strange Gods" and "Exit, Pursued by a Bear"
Ernie Brooks – bass guitar on "After Strange Gods" and "Exit, Pursued by a Bear"
Jason Candler – engineering
Greg Cohen – acoustic bass guitar on "Jericho"
Sonya Cohen – spoken word on "Jericho", "I Want to Play Your Guitar" and "Out from Under"
Anthony Coleman – piano on "Exit, Pursued by a Bear"
Dina Emerson – spoken word on "After Strange Gods" and "Exit, Pursued by a Bear"
Anthony Kane – Jew's harp on "After Strange Gods"
Kumiko Kimoto – spoken word on "The Nightmare of History"
Eric Kory – cello on "I Want to Play Your Guitar"
Kenny & Larry – spoken word on "Poison I.V. League"
A. Leroy – spinet on "Jericho"
Fredrick Lonberg-Holm – cello on "Jericho"
Sammy Merendino – sampler, drums
Jared Nickerson – bass guitar on "I Want to Play Your Guitar"
Manfred Rahs – photography
Bill Ruyle – hammered dulcimer on "Jericho"
Tony Thunder Smith – drums on "I Want to Play Your Guitar"
Chuck Valle – engineering
Murray Weinstock – production, engineering
Brad Worrell – engineering

References

External links 
 
 

1994 albums
Gary Lucas albums
Enemy Records albums